Richard Beckett may refer to:
Richard Beckett (cricketer) (1772–1809), English amateur cricketer and captain during the Napoleonic Wars
Richard Beckett (author) (1936–1987), Australian author and journalist
Richard Beckett, 3rd Baronet (born 1944) of the Beckett baronets
Rick Beckett, American radio broadcaster
Richard B. Beckett (1919–1983), Canadian politician

See also
Beckett (disambiguation)